Xu Jiaqi (born August 27, 1995) is a Chinese singer, rapper, dancer, songwriter, and actress. She was a member of Team SII of the female idol group SNH48 as well as its sub-units Style-7 and 7Senses, and she was also a member of the temporary girl group, THE9. In 2020, she participated in Youth with You 2 and got 3rd place, securing her place in THE9. She is also known for her role in the television series Legend of Yunxi (2018) as well as her leading role in The Blooms at Ruyi Pavilion (2020) as Fu Xuan.

Early life
Xu was born on August 27, 1995 in Linhai, Taizhou, Zhejiang, China. She graduated from Shanghai Film Art Academy and Shanghai Normal University.

Career

2012–2020: SNH48 and acting debut
On 14 October 2012, during an SNH48 press conference, Xu was announced as one of the first-generation members of SNH48.

On 25 May 2013, Xu performed at the "Blooming For You" Concert. On 11 November, she was promoted to SNH48 Team SII, and on 12 December, she starred in SNH48's first documentary, "MengXiang YuBei Sheng". On 16 December, she performed at the SNH48 Guangzhou Concert.

On 18 January 2014, Xu participated in the Red and White Concert, of which Team SII emerged as the winner. On 26 July, during SNH48's first General Election, Xu came in eighth with 7256 votes, subsequently becoming part of the Senbatsu for their fifth single.

On 31 January 2015, Xu performed at SNH48 Request Hour Setlist Best 30 2015. On 25 July, during SNH48's second General Election, she came in 20th with 14351.7 votes and was placed among the Under Girls. On 31 October, Xu came in first during SNH48's first Fashion Awards and became part of SNH48's sub-unit Style-7.

In 2016, it was announced that Xu would star in the film Catman together with bandmate Ju Jingyi, due to be released in 2017. Xu made her acting debut with a cameo on the drama Stairway to Stardom. On 30 July, during SNH48's third General Election, Xu was ranked 11th with 27,388.8 votes. On 5 November, she came in first during SNH48's second Fashion Awards. On March 19, Xu was announced as one of the members of SNH48's sub-unit 7SENSES. They released their first EP, "7SENSES" on April 20. On July 29, during SNH48's fourth General Election, Xu came in tenth with 54678.8 votes.

Xu played a supporting role in the historical romance drama Legend of Yunxi in 2018. In addition, on July 28, 2018, Xu came in 7th with 91,582.06 votes during SNH48's fifth General Election.

On July 29, 2019, during SNH48's sixth General Election, Xu maintained her ranking and came in 7th with 839,586 votes.

On October 14, 2020, Xu graduated alongside the other remaining first-generation members of SNH48. October 12 marked 8 years since SNH48's formation.

2020–present: Youth With You 2, THE9 and solo activities

Xu participated on the reality girl group survival show Youth With You 2, which was aired on March 12, 2020. Xu is set to star in the dramas The Blooms at Ruyi Pavilion and Lost Parallel.

On May 30, 2020, in the finale of Youth With You 2, Xu placed 3rd with 9,086,752 votes, thus earning a coveted spot in the final ground group, THE9.

After the competition, she has done several solo endeavors such as fashion shows, magazine shootings and commercial shootings. She released a special fan song for her fandom (Blackis) called “Stand by Me”. She also landed 2 main roles notably in The Blooms at Ruyi Pavilion alongside Ju Jingyi with Wang Youshuo as her male lead.

THE9 disbanded on December 5th 2021.

Public image
Xu has been referred to as "short-hair Chinese Goddess" by Chinese and South Korean fans and media since her South Korea debut with 7Senses in 2019.

Discography

Singles

Idol Producer (Season 2)

Filmography

Film

Television series

Television shows

Individual endorsements
 Kiss Me (2016)
 Tuhu (2016)
 Skechers China (2018)
 Mclon (2018)
 Shu Uemura (2019)
 Mamonde (2019)
 花果轻乳 (2020)

SNH48 activities

EPs

Albums
 Mae Shika Mukanee (2014)

Units

SNH48 Stage Units

Concert units

Notes

References

External links

 Official Member Profile 
 
 

1995 births
Living people
SNH48 members
THE9 members
People from Taizhou, Zhejiang
Japanese-language singers
Korean-language singers of China
Chinese film actresses
Chinese idols
Chinese television actresses
21st-century Chinese actresses
Actresses from Zhejiang
Youth With You contestants